Calliprogonos is a monotypic moth genus of the family Brahmaeidae. It contains only one species, Calliprogonos miraculosa, which is found in China. Both the genus and species were first described by Rudolf Mell in 1937.

References

Brahmaeidae
Moths described in 1937
Monotypic moth genera